Brevens bruk is a minor locality in Örebro Municipality, Örebro County, Sweden. 121 people were living there in 2007. Brevens bruk is located near the tripoint of Örebro, Södermanland and Östergötland counties. It is situated in a tri-village area more or less halfway on the road between Högsjö across the Sörmlandic border and Kilsmo to its north. It is famous for a traditional Swedish midsummer celebration held every year. Thousands of people from neighbouring areas gather and celebrate. The celebration has drawn attention all the way to Germany and hundreds of German tourists share in the celebration.

Riksdag elections

References

External links

Populated places in Örebro County
Populated places in Örebro Municipality